Tyrannical Mex is an album released by rockabilly punk group Shillelagh Sisters. It was released in 1993.

In 1993, Jacquie O'Sullivan, Halpin, and Boz Boorer got together again as the Shillelagh Sisters for a Japanese tour. They recorded an album in one day and in live conditions, titled "Tyrannical Mex", prior to the tour, and then went to Japan with drummer Woodie Taylor. The album was composed of the early material the girls used to perform and is way more similar to their original sound than the 1984 CBS singles.

Track listing
Original track listing
 "Fool I Am"
 "Bang Bang"
 "Black Cadillac"
 "Let's Elope"
 "Romp & Stomp"
 "These Boots Are Made For Walkin'"
 "My Man"
 "Hoy Hoy"
 "Rockin' Lady"
 "If You Can't Rock Me"
 "Gotta Know"
 "Gotta Lotta Rhythm"

Bonus tracks from Boz's Blues E.P.
 "Sneakin' & Splippin"
 "Mojo Boogie"
 "Shake Baby Shake"

Bonus tracks 
 "Mojo Boogie"
 "Dig Myself A Hole"

Credits
Shillelagh Sisters - producer
Boz Boorer - producer (bonus tracks)

Release history

References

1993 debut albums
Shillelagh Sisters albums